was a planned autobahn in Germany. It was supposed to connect Breisach via Freiburg im Breisgau - Titisee - Donaueschingen - Tuttlingen - Riedlingen - Ulm to Langenau. Part of it has been built as the A 864.

The construction of the Autobahn stopped.

External links 

86
A086